Men or Not Men is a 1980 Italian war-drama film directed by  Valentino Orsini. It is based on the novel with the same name by Elio Vittorini.

Cast 
Flavio Bucci as  Enne 2 
Monica Guerritore as Berta 
Ivana Monti as  Lorena
Massimo Foschi as  El Paso
Renato Scarpa as  Cane Nero  
Francesco Salvi 		
Michele Soavi

References

External links

1980 films
Italian war drama films
Films directed by Valentino Orsini
1980s war drama films
Films scored by Ennio Morricone
Italian Campaign of World War II films
Films about Italian resistance movement
1980 drama films
Italian World War II films
1980s Italian-language films
1980s Italian films